Loch Leven is the name of several lakes in California, United States, in the Sierra Nevada.

Inyo County

Loch Leven in Inyo County, California, was named after Loch Leven in Scotland.

Placer County
The Loch Leven Lakes are located in Placer County, California.

The Loch Leven Lakes are a popular day hike, with the U.S. Forest Service rating the trail's use level as "heavy" and its difficulty as "moderate".

See also
List of lakes in California

References

Lakes of the Sierra Nevada (United States)
Lakes of Inyo County, California
Lakes of Placer County, California
Lakes of California
Lakes of Northern California